Neufeld is a surname of German origin, meaning "new field".

 Dale Neufeld, former director of the Canadian Security Intelligence Service
 Elizabeth F. Neufeld (born 1928), American geneticist
 Gordon Neufeld (born 1946), Canadian psychologist
 Harold Neufeld (born 1927), Canadian politician from Manitoba
 Josh Neufeld (born 1967), American non-fiction cartoonist
 Kevin Neufeld (born 1960), Canadian Olympic rower
 Mace Neufeld (1928–2022), American film and television producer
 Maurice F. Neufeld (1910–2003), American academic, author, and union organizer
 Michael J. Neufeld (born 1951), Canadian space historian and author
 Peter Neufeld (born 1950), American lawyer; co-founder of the Innocence Project
 Randy Neufeld (born 1962), Canadian curler
 Ray Neufeld (born 1959), Canadian professional ice hockey player
 Richard Neufeld (born 1944), Canadian politician from British Columbia
 Rick Neufeld, Canadian folk singer
 Ryan Neufeld (born 1975), American professional football player
 Sarah Neufeld (born 1979), Canadian violinist

German-language surnames
Russian Mennonite surnames